We'll Take Manhattan is a British television film that tells the story of the extramarital affair between photographer David Bailey and model Jean Shrimpton, and their one-week photographic assignment in New York City for Vogue in 1962. Directed by John McKay, it stars Aneurin Barnard as David Bailey, and Karen Gillan as Jean Shrimpton.

Broadcast

The film was first broadcast on 26 January 2012 on BBC Four in the UK, and in the US on Ovation on 11 February 2012.

Recreating the shoot

The film-makers used a variety of techniques to recreate the photos from the original Bailey shoot. Where possible they were recreated at the same or near identical locations in Manhattan, while others were recreated using a combination of props, and computer-generated imagery.

Soundtrack

Jazz music, composed by Kevin Sargent is used throughout the film, reflecting David Bailey's love for the genre. Dedicated themes accompany each of the main protagonists.

Reception

Critical response
The drama received generally warm reviews, particularly for the performances of Aneurin Barnard, Karen Gillan, and Helen McCrory as Lady Clare Rendlesham.

Accolades
 
The film received the award for Best European TV Drama at the Prix Europa awards in 2012.

References

External links
 

2012 television films
2012 films
2012 biographical drama films
2012 romantic drama films
2010s English-language films
Adultery in films
Biographical films about models
Biographical films about photographers
British biographical drama films
British romantic drama films
Films directed by John McKay
Films set in 1962
Films set in Manhattan
Films shot in New York City
Romance television films
2010s British films
British drama television films